The 2001 RCA Championships was a men's tennis tournament played on outdoor hard courts at the Indianapolis Tennis Center in Indianapolis, Indiana in the United States and was part of the International Series Gold of the 2001 ATP Tour. It was the 14th edition of the tournament and ran from August 13 through August 19, 2001.

Finals

Singles

 Patrick Rafter defeated  Gustavo Kuerten 4–2 (Kuerten retired)
 It was Rafter's only singles title of the year and the 11th and last of his career.

Doubles

 Mark Knowles /  Brian MacPhie defeated  Mahesh Bhupathi /  Sébastien Lareau 7–6(7–5), 5–7, 6–4
 It was Knowles' 3rd title of the year and the 17th of his career. It was MacPhie's 2nd title of the year and the 4th of his career.

References

External links
 ITF tournament edition details